Mitra Tabrizian (born in Tehran) is a British-Iranian photographer and film director. She is a professor of photography at the University of Westminster, London. Mitra Tabrizian has exhibited and published widely and in major international museums and galleries, including her solo exhibition at the Tate Britain in 2008. Her book, Another Country, with texts by Homi Bhabha, David Green, and Hamid Naficy, was published by Hatje Cantz in 2012.

Early life and career
Born in Tehran, Iran, Tabrizian  studied at the Polytechnic of Central London in the 1980s. 
Tabrizian published her first monograph, Correct Distance, in 1990. In 1992, she was included in a survey edition of Ten.8 magazine "Critical decade : Black British photography in the 80s". Her book of photographs, Beyond the Limits (2004), is a critique of corporate culture and is inspired by the works of Jean Baudrillard and Jean-François Lyotard. Her films include Journey of No Return (1993), The Third Woman (1991), and The Predator (2004).

Tabrizian has exhibited her work at the Tate, Modern Art Oxford, Gallery Lelong, New York, the Architectural Association, London, and numerous film festivals. In January 2018, she exhibited at London Art Fair with Arte Globale.

Publications
Correct Distance. Manchester: Cornerhouse, 1990. With a text by Griselda Pollock.
Beyond the limits. Göttingen, Germany: Steidl, 2004. With texts by Stuart Hall, Christopher Williams, Francette Pacteau and a contribution from Homi K. Bhabha.
This is That Place. London: Tate, 2008. Catalogue. With a text by T. J. Demos.
Another Country. Berlin: Hatje Cantz, 2012. With texts by Bhabha, David Green, and Hamid Naficy.

Films
The Third Woman (1991) – writer and director, 16 mm, 20 mins
Journey of No Return (1993) – writer and director, 16 mm, 23 mins
The Predator (2004) – writer and director, 35 mm, 28 mins
Gholam (2017) – writer and director, 94 mins

Solo exhibitions
Museum of Folkwang, Germany, 2003
Jenseits der Grenzen, (Beyond the Limits), Kunstlerhaus Bethanien, Berlin, Germany, 2004
BBK, Bilbao, Spain, 2004
Moderna Mussset (Museum of Modern art) Stockholm, Sweden, 2006
Tate Britain, London (June- August), 2008
Caprice Horn Gallery, Berlin (June- Sept.), 2008
Albion gallery, London (Jan- Feb.), 2009
'Project B, Contemporary Art' , Milan (Feb.-April), 2011

Group exhibitions 

 The Selectors' Show, Camerawork, London, UK, 1984
 Mitra Tabriziam, Victor Burgin, Mari Mahr, The Photographers Gallery, London, UK,1986
 Shocks to the System: Social and Political Issues in Recent British Art from the Arts Council Collection, South Bank Centre, London, UK, 1991
 Fine Material for a Dream...? A Reappraisal of Orientalism, Harris Museum & Art Gallery, Preston, UK, 1992

Awards
2021: Honorary Fellowship of the Royal Photographic Society
2005. Arts & Humanities Research Center (AHRC) Research Leave Grant
2005. The Arts Council, UK
2004. Arts & Humanities Research Center (AHRC) Grants in the Creative & Performing Arts
2004. The Arts Council, UK
2003. Arts & Humanities Research Board (AHRB) Innovation Awards
1996. London Arts Board
1993. British Film Institute
1993. Greater London Arts (GLA), film award British Film Institute
1993. Photographers' Gallery Trust Fund
1987. Metro Billboard Project, Newcastle, UK
1987. Greater London Arts, Photography award
1985. National Museum of Photography, Film & Television, photography award UK
1985. Greater London Arts, photography award
1985. Arts Council photography award, UK

Sources
Brighton Photo Biennial 2006. Artists, Mitra Tabrizian. Accessed 18 December 2007.
University of Westminster. Centre for Research and Education in Art and Media (CREAM), Research Staff, s.v. "Prof. Mitra Tabrizian". Accessed 18 December 2007.
Steidl. Artists, "Mitra Tabrizian". Accessed 18 December 2007.

References

External links
Official site
Mitra Tabrizian auf culturebase.net

1959 births
Living people
Iranian photographers
Iranian women photographers